APTI may refer to:
 Alaska Public Telecommunications, Inc.
 Advanced Power Technologies, Inc.
 Asociación Panameña de Traductores e Intérpretes, Panamanian member organization of the International Federation of Translators
 A Passage to India, book and film
 Apti, Maharashtra, a small village in Maharashtra state in Western India
 Association for Preservation Technology International